Kainos Group plc (commonly referred to simply as Kainos or Kainos Software) is a software company headquartered in Belfast, Northern Ireland that develops information technology for businesses and organisations. It is listed on the London Stock Exchange and is a constituent of the FTSE 250 Index.

Name
The word Kainos comes from ancient Greek, meaning "new" or "fresh".

History

1986 to 2009

Kainos was founded as a joint venture between Fujitsu and The Queen's University of Belfast business incubation unit (QUBIS Ltd) on 14 April 1986. In January 1987, the company began trading in the QUBIS building on Malone Road, Belfast and Kainos founder, Frank Graham, was appointed managing director.

A spin-off company of Kainos was established in 1994 called Lagan Technologies, which grew to become a software supplier into local government in the UK and the US. It was eventually acquired by U.S. based Kana Software in 2010.

By 1997, due to the expansion of the company, Kainos relocated and opened offices in Mount Charles, Belfast, and opened its main headquarters in Upper Crescent, Belfast.

After several years of business, in which Fujitsu was its main customer, the company sold most of its stake to ACT Venture capital in 2000. ACT Venture capital later divested its shareholding in Kainos.

In September 2004, Kainos entered into a partnership agreement with Mediasurface, the UK's largest content management provider. The following year, Kainos entered into another partnership agreement in 2005 with TIBCO, a provider of infrastructure software.

In 2007, a wholly owned subsidiary of Kainos called SpeechStorm was established, providing automated products for call centres, including touch tone, SMS, speech and visual IVR. That same year, management in Kainos bought out Fujitsu's remaining 20% shares.

2010 to present
Kainos expanded its operations and opened a research office in Silicon Valley on 18 October 2010.

On 19 November 2014, Kainos announced its plans to expand the Evolve Electronic Medical Records platform into Ireland.

On 10 July 2015, Kainos was admitted to the main market of the London Stock Exchange, trading as Kainos Group plc.

As part of an extension of its US operation, in June 2020, Kainos announced plans to create 133 jobs in Indianapolis. The plans included expenditure of £650,000 to build new facilities in the area, marking the first venture into the US Midwest.

Divisions

Digital Services
Kainos is a provider of digital services to government departments and agencies.

WorkSmart
Kainos has been a Workday implementation partner since 2011, providing management, integration, support and testing services for the Workday SaaS product.

Evolve
Kainos provides digital services to healthcare providers such as hospitals and community care organisations. Developed with NHS clinicians and managers, the Evolve EMR is the main product in Kainos's suite of healthcare products.

See also

References

External links
 Official website

Software companies of the United Kingdom
Companies established in 1986
1986 establishments in Northern Ireland
Companies of Northern Ireland
Companies based in Belfast
Brands of Northern Ireland